Electronic Music Midwest (EMM) is a festival of new electroacoustic music.

History
EMM is the result of a consortium formed between Kansas City Kansas Community College (KCKCC), Lewis University, and the University of Missouri–Kansas City. This festival was founded by Mike McFerron, Connie Mayfield, and Paul Rudy in 2000 when it was presented at KCKCC under the name "Kansas City Electronic Music Festival." In 2001, the festival continued at Lewis University under the title, "Electronic Music at Lewis - 2001."  Electronic Music Midwest became the official name at the 2002 festival held at Kansas City Kansas Community College.

In celebration of EMM's 10th anniversary, Lewis University hosted the first EMM mini-Invitational festival on March 11, 2010.  15 composers were invited to present up to 15 minutes of music during this one-day, three concert festival.  Among other compositions, highlights from this festival included Three Improvisatory Groovescapes (performed by the composer) by EMM technical director, Ian Corbett, Tranquility by Kyong Mee Choi, Bapu (performed by Lisa Bost-Sandberg) by Asha Srinivasan, and Texturologie 6: Emerald Emergent by James Caldwell.

Electronic Music Midwest (EMM) alternates each year between Kansas City, Kansas and the suburbs of Chicago in Romeoville, Illinois.  Besides the main festival which is usually takes place over three days.  The festival also presents "mini" festivals which are one day events presented as outreach to other cities. Composer's Voice Concert Series hosted an EMM mini-Invitational festival In New York City on June 24, 2012.  Western Michigan University as part of is New Sounds Festival hosted EMM mini-Invitational festival in Kalamazoo, Michigan.

EMM has always featured an 8-speaker surround diffusion system under the guidance of Ian Corbett. The core of the system are eight Mackie 1521 bi-amped speakers, an EAW/QSC subwoofer system, and a Soundcraft MH3, 32+4 Channel mixer.

Since its beginning, EMM has programmed over 500 new electroacoustic compositions. Composers have traveled from around the world to graciously share their music with audiences in the Midwest. EMM strives to create an environment conducive to building community interaction. "Electronic Music Midwest has been dedicated to program a variety of electro-acoustic music, and to provide the highest quality of e-media presentations."

Most concerts are approximately one hour long, and composers have plenty of time to "talk shop" with each other as well as interact socially with students and audience members.

Special guest composers and performers
Tom Lopez - 2000 (Kansas City Electronic Music Festival - KCKCC)
James Mobberley - 2001 ("Electronic Music at Lewis - 2001")
Mark Applebaum - Spring 2002 (KCKCC)
Elizabeth McNutt - Fall 2002 (Lewis University)
Mark Wingate - Fall 2003 (UMKC)
Kevin Austin - Fall 2004 (Lewis University)
Robert Voisey and 60x60 - Fall 2005 (KCKCC)
CECh Celebrating 50 Years of Electroacoustic Music from Chile  - Fall 2006 (Lewis University)
Chicago Composers Forum - Fall 2008
60x60 Dance - Fall 2009 (KCKCC)
Kansas City Electronic Music and Arts Alliance (KcEMA) - Fall 2009 (KCKCC)
Rebecca Ashe - Fall 2010 (Lewis University)
Elizabeth Bunt - Fall 2011 (KCKCC)
Andrew Spencer - Fall 2012 (Lewis University)
Kari Johnson - Fall 2013 (KCKCC)
Craig Hultgren - Fall 2014 (Lewis University)
Keith Benjamin - Fall 2015 (KCKCC) 
Sarah Plum - Fall 2016 (Lewis University)
Splice Ensemble - Fall 2017 (KCKCC) 
Margaret Lancaster - Fall 2018 (Lewis University) 
Drew Whiting - Fall 2019 (KCKCC)
Andrea Cheeseman - Spring 2022 
ScottDeal - Spring 2020

Staff
Mike McFerron - founder and festival director
Ian Corbett - festival director/technical director
Jay Batzner - programming director
Jason Bolte - technical director
David McIntire - marketing director
Robert Voisey - organization advancement director

Participating composers
Among others, EMM has programmed music by the following composers:

Birgitte Alsted, Linda Antas, Larry Austin, Andrew Babcock, Jeremy Baguyos, Jay Batzner, Martin Bedard, Brian Belet, Kari Besharse, Christopher Biggs, Scott Blasco, Marita Bolles, Jason Bolte, Michael Boyd, Taylor Briggs, Kirsten Broberg, Benjamin Broening, George Brunner, Ivica Bukvic, Madelyn Byrne, James Caldwell, Clifton Callender, Camila Cano, Jen-Kuang Chang, Kyong Mee Choi, Da Jeong Choi, Young-Shin Choi, Joshua Clausen, Andrew Seager Cole, William Coogan, Ian Corbett, Christopher Danforth, Ken Davies, Nathan Davis, Brad Decker, David DeVasto, Greg Dixon, Aaron Doenges, Ben Dorfan, Matthew Dotson, Nicholas Drake, Michael Drew, Ivan Elezovic, Rachel Evans (musician), Robert Fleisher, Mike Frengel, Lawrence Fritts, Jason Geistweidt, Jacob Gotlib, Arthur Gottschalk, Côté Guillaume, Moon Young Ha, Kip Haaheim, Randall Hall, Jonathan Hallstrom, Adam Hardin, Nickolas Hartgrove, Jeffrey Hass, James Hegarty, Jeff Herriott, Eric Honour, Robert Honstein, Hubert Howe, Tsai Yun Huang, Peter Hulen, Marie Incontrera, Ryan Ingebritsen, Karl Jentzsch, Timothy Johnson, Richard Johnson, Brooke Joyce, Noah Keesecker, Kevin Kissinger, Laura Kramer, Kadet Kuhne, John Latartara, HyeKyung Lee, Elainie Lillios, Cort Lippe, Hunter Long, Ed Martin, Robert McClure, Mike McFerron, David McIntire, Christian McLeer, Jim McManus, Louis Migliazza, Brent Milam, Katarina Miljkovic, Julia Miller, Jason Mitchell, James Mobberley, Dohi Moon, David Mooney, David Morneau, Rick Nance, Adam Scott Neal, Israel Neuman, Paul Oehlers, Yemin Oh, Michael Olson, Joo Won Park, Ronald Parks, Tom Parsons, Sean Peuquet, Michael Pounds, Christopher Preissing, Tim Reed, Tony Reimer, Michael Reimer, 60x60, David Roberts, Jonathan Robertson, Thomas Royal, Marcus Rubio, Paul Rudy, Jake Rundall, Salil Sachdev, James Sain, Alexander Schubert, Philip Schuessler, Liza Seigido, Chris Shortway, Eric Simonson, Steven Snethkamp, Steven Snowden, Mark Snyder, Jorge Sosa, Asha Srinivasan, Jack Stamps, Timothy Stulman, Daniel Swilley, Jerry Tabor, Chenyu Sun, Paul Thomas, Spencer Topel, Schuyler Tsuda, Sam Tymorek, Audrey Valentine, Bob Valentine, Bert Van Herck, Dan VanHassel, Angela Veomett, Joseph Vogel, Robert Voisey, Andrew Walters, Brett Wartchow, Lauren Wells, Tom Williams, Benjamin Williams, Zackery Wilson, Bart Woodstrup, Nihan Yesil, Samson Young, Peiying Yuan, Richard Zarou, Bei Zhang, Zachariah Zubow

Articles & reviews
Kari Väkevän teos kantaesitetään Kansasissa Lansivayla on 11/17/2015 - 17:00  CULTURE 
Electronic Music Midwest to make sounds, beautiful to 'granulated and anxious' at the Dalton Center  Mark Wedel, Special to the Kalamazoo Gazette on March 12, 2013
2007 EMM Festival in Kansas City by Asymmetry Magazine. Quote: "...smooth-running, well-organized, sonically and musically superior event, put on by some truly lovely people."

See also
List of electronic music festivals

References

External links
 Official website

Music festivals established in 2000
Music organizations based in the United States
2002 establishments in Missouri
Electronic music festivals in the United States
Electroacoustic music festivals